The 2014 CFL Draft took place on Tuesday, May 13, 2014 at 7:00 PM ET on TSN. 65 players were chosen from among eligible players from Canadian Universities across the country, as well as Canadian players playing in the NCAA. A total of 19 trades were made involving draft picks from this year, including six made on draft day itself, with five involving picks from the first round.

The Ottawa Redblacks were scheduled to pick first in each round of the 2013 CFL Draft, and were supposed to have two bonus picks at the end of the draft. Due to stadium delays, Ottawa will join the Canadian Football League in 2014, and those stipulations will be applied to this year's draft instead. After the CFL announced that drafts would be expanding to seven rounds, it was stated that this draft would have 63 selections, implying that Ottawa would no longer receive the two bonus picks at the end of the draft. However, after the 2014 draft order was released on February 23, 2014, it was revealed that Ottawa would, indeed, receive two selections at the end of the draft, increasing the total number of draftable players to 65.

Beginning with the 2014 draft, non-import CIS players will be eligible to be selected in the draft three years after completing their first season of eligibility. This eliminates any rookies who sat out or redshirted for their first playing year and would be eligible to return to university. Prior to this change, players were eligible to be selected after their fourth year of post-secondary education. Additionally, for non-import players playing in the NCAA or NAIA, they are now eligible to be selected after completing their senior year. This change eliminates the possibility of NCAA or NAIA students returning to college after being drafted. This change had a significant impact as it was the highest percentage of CIS/CIAU players drafted (90.8%) since 1972 when only Canadian institutions were included in the draft. Additionally, the 59 CIS players drafted was the most since the 1978 CFL Draft when 74 of 90 players drafted came from CIS programs. Finally, only one drafted player, Tchissakid Player, was from a U.S. school (Northwestern State). The other five non-CIS draftees were all from Simon Fraser, the only NCAA member in Canada.

The first round was broadcast live on TSN with CFL Commissioner Mark Cohon announcing the first selection. The production was hosted by Rod Black and featured the CFL on TSN panel which included Duane Forde, Chris Schultz, Paul LaPolice, Farhan Lalji, and Lee Barrette who analyzed the teams' needs and picks. However, the broadcast was not without controversy as viewers initially needed to be subscribed to Bell Satellite TV or Rogers TV in order to view online. TSN later recognized the mistake and made the draft viewable to everyone online.

Top prospects 
Source: CFL Scouting Bureau rankings.

Trades
In the explanations below, (D) denotes trades that took place during the draft, while (PD) indicates trades completed pre-draft.

Round one
 Hamilton → Saskatchewan (PD). Hamilton traded this selection, Shomari Williams, and Josh Bartel to Saskatchewan for the ninth and eleventh picks in this year's draft.
 Saskatchewan → Hamilton (PD). Saskatchewan traded this selection and the eleventh pick in this year's draft to Hamilton for Shomari Williams, Josh Bartel, and the eighth pick in this year's draft.
 Ottawa → Calgary (PD). Ottawa traded the first overall selection and the playing rights to Marwan Hage to Calgary for Jon Gott.
 Edmonton → Toronto (D). Edmonton traded this selection and the 21st overall selection to Toronto for the sixth overall selection, the 15th overall selection, Tony Washington, and Otha Foster.
 Toronto → Edmonton (D). Toronto traded this selection, the 15th overall selection, Tony Washington, and Otha Foster to Edmonton for the third overall selection and the 21st overall selection.
 BC → Ottawa (D). BC traded this selection to Ottawa for Kevin Glenn.
 Montreal → Ottawa (D). Montreal traded this selection and the 13th overall selection to Ottawa for the fifth overall selection and the 10th overall selection.
 Ottawa → Montreal (D). Ottawa traded this selection and the 10th overall selection to Montreal for the fourth overall selection and the 13th overall selection.
 Saskatchewan → Hamilton (D). Saskatchewan traded this selection to Hamilton for the 11th overall selection and the 17th overall selection.

Round two
 Edmonton → BC (PD). Edmonton traded this selection and a second round pick in the 2013 CFL Draft to BC for Mike Reilly and a second round pick in the 2013 CFL Draft.
 Winnipeg → Saskatchewan (PD). Winnipeg traded this selection and Alex Hall to Saskatchewan for Patrick Neufeld and a fourth-round pick in the 2015 CFL Draft.
 Saskatchewan → Hamilton (PD). Saskatchewan traded this selection and the ninth pick in this year's draft to Hamilton for Shomari Williams, Josh Bartel, and the eighth pick in this year's draft.
 Toronto → Edmonton (D). Toronto traded this selection, the sixth overall selection, Tony Washington, and Otha Foster to Edmonton for the third overall selection and the 21st overall selection.
 Ottawa → Montreal (D). Ottawa traded this selection and the fifth overall selection to Montreal for the fourth overall selection and the 13th overall selection.
 Montreal → Ottawa (D). Montreal traded this selection and the fourth overall selection to Ottawa for the fifth overall selection and the 10th overall selection.
 Hamilton → Saskatchewan (D). Hamilton traded two second round selections to Saskatchewan for the eighth overall selection.
 Saskatchewan → Winnipeg (D). Saskatchewan traded this selection to Winnipeg for the 20th overall selection and the 26th overall selection.

Round three
 Hamilton → Calgary (PD). Hamilton traded this selection to Calgary for a sixth-round pick in this year's draft and Geoff Tisdale.
 Saskatchewan → BC (PD). Saskatchewan traded this selection and Justin Harper to BC for Geroy Simon.
 BC → Calgary (PD). BC traded this selection to Calgary for Steve Myddelton.
 Toronto → Winnipeg (PD). Toronto traded this selection and Marc Parenteau to Winnipeg for Anthony Woodson and a fifth-round pick in this year's draft.
 Winnipeg → Calgary (PD). Winnipeg traded this selection to Calgary for Chris Randle and the 26th pick in this year's draft.
 Calgary → Winnipeg (PD). Calgary traded this selection and Chris Randle to Winnipeg for the 24th pick in this year's draft.
 Ottawa → Calgary (PD). Ottawa traded this selection and a third-round pick in the 2015 CFL Draft to Calgary for Justin Phillips and a third-round selection in this year's draft.
 Calgary → Ottawa (PD). Calgary traded this selection and Justin Phillips to Ottawa for a third-round selection in this year's draft and a third-round pick in the 2015 CFL Draft.
 Edmonton → Toronto (D). Edmonton traded this selection and the third overall selection to Toronto for the sixth overall selection, the 15th overall selection, Tony Washington, and Otha Foster.
 Winnipeg → Saskatchewan (D). Winnipeg traded two third-round selections to Saskatchewan for the 17th overall selection.

Round four
 Hamilton → Montreal (PD). Hamilton traded this selection to Montreal for Dahrran Diedrick.
 Saskatchewan → Toronto (PD). Saskatchewan traded a conditional draft pick to Toronto for Chris Patrick. This pick was originally a conditional pick that became a fourth-round pick.

Round five
 Winnipeg → Toronto (PD). Winnipeg traded this selection and Anthony Woodson to Toronto for Marc Parenteau and a third-round pick in this year's draft.
 Edmonton → Saskatchewan (PD). Edmonton traded a conditional draft pick to Saskatchewan for Hugh Charles. This pick was originally a conditional pick that became a fifth-round pick.
 Calgary → Montreal (PD). Calgary traded this selection and Larry Taylor to Montreal for the 40th pick in this year's draft. The trade includes conditional picks in the 2015 CFL Draft.
 Montreal → Calgary (PD). Montreal traded this selection to Calgary for Larry Taylor and the 43rd pick in this year's draft. The trade includes conditional picks in the 2015 CFL Draft.

Round six
 Calgary → Hamilton (PD). Calgary traded this selection and Geoff Tisdale to Hamilton for a third-round pick in this year's draft.

Draft order

Round one

Round two

Round three

Round four

Round five

Round six

Round seven

References

Canadian College Draft
2014 in Canadian football